Baseball statistics play an important role in evaluating the progress of a player or team.

Since the flow of a baseball game has natural breaks to it, and normally players act individually rather than performing in clusters, the sport lends itself to easy record-keeping and statistics. Statistics have been kept for professional baseball since the creation of the National League and American League, now part of Major League Baseball.

Many statistics are also available from outside Major League Baseball, from leagues such as the National Association of Professional Base Ball Players and the Negro leagues, although the consistency of whether these records were kept, of the standards with respect to which they were calculated, and of their accuracy has varied.

Development
The practice of keeping records of player achievements was started in the 19th century by Henry Chadwick. Based on his experience with the sport of cricket, Chadwick devised the predecessors to modern-day statistics including batting average, runs scored, and runs allowed.

Traditionally, statistics such as batting average (the number of hits divided by the number of at bats) and earned run average (the average number of earned runs allowed by a pitcher per nine innings) have dominated attention in the statistical world of baseball. However, the recent advent of sabermetrics has created statistics drawing from a greater breadth of player performance measures and playing field variables. Sabermetrics and comparative statistics attempt to provide an improved measure of a player's performance and contributions to his team from year to year, frequently against a statistical performance average.

Comprehensive, historical baseball statistics were difficult for the average fan to access until 1951, when researcher Hy Turkin published The Complete Encyclopedia of Baseball. In 1969, Macmillan Publishing printed its first Baseball Encyclopedia, using a computer to compile statistics for the first time. Known as "Big Mac", the encyclopedia became the standard baseball reference until 1988, when Total Baseball was released by Warner Books using more sophisticated technology. The publication of Total Baseball led to the discovery of several "phantom ballplayers", such as Lou Proctor, who did not belong in official record books and were removed.

Use
Throughout modern baseball, a few core statistics have been traditionally referenced – batting average, RBI, and home runs. To this day, a player who leads the league in all of these three statistics earns the "Triple Crown". For pitchers, wins, ERA, and strikeouts are the most often-cited statistics, and a pitcher leading his league in these statistics may also be referred to as a "triple crown" winner. General managers and baseball scouts have long used the major statistics, among other factors and opinions, to understand player value. Managers, catchers and pitchers use the statistics of batters of opposing teams to develop pitching strategies and set defensive positioning on the field. Managers and batters study opposing pitcher performance and motions in attempting to improve hitting. Scouts use stats when they are looking at a player who they may end up drafting or signing to a contract.

Some sabermetric statistics have entered the mainstream baseball world that measure a batter's overall performance including on-base plus slugging, commonly referred to as OPS. OPS adds the hitter's on-base percentage (number of times reached base by any means divided by total plate appearances) to their slugging percentage (total bases divided by at-bats).  Some argue that the OPS formula is flawed and that more weight should be shifted towards OBP (on-base percentage). The statistic wOBA (weighted on-base average) attempts to correct for this.

OPS is also useful when determining a pitcher's level of success. "Opponent on-base plus slugging" (OOPS) is becoming a popular tool to evaluate a pitcher's actual performance.  When analyzing a pitcher's statistics, some useful categories include K/9IP (strikeouts per nine innings), K/BB (strikeouts per walk), HR/9 (home runs per nine innings), WHIP (walks plus hits per inning pitched), and OOPS (opponent on-base plus slugging).

However, since 2001, more emphasis has been placed on defense-independent pitching statistics, including defense-independent ERA (dERA), in an attempt to evaluate a pitcher's performance regardless of the strength of the defensive players behind them.

All of the above statistics may be used in certain game situations. For example, a certain hitter's ability to hit left-handed pitchers might incline a manager to increase their opportunities to face left-handed pitchers. Other hitters may have a history of success against a given pitcher (or vice versa), and the manager may use this information to create a favorable
match-up. This is often referred  to as "playing the percentages".

Commonly used statistics
Most of these terms also apply to softball. Commonly used statistics with their abbreviations are explained here. The explanations below are for quick reference and do not fully or completely define the statistic; for the strict definition, see the linked article for each statistic.

Batting statistics
 1B – Single: hits on which the batter reaches first base safely without the contribution of a fielding error
 2B – Double: hits on which the batter reaches second base safely without the contribution of a fielding error
 3B – Triple: hits on which the batter reaches third base safely without the contribution of a fielding error
 AB – At bat: plate appearances, not including bases on balls, being hit by pitch, sacrifices, interference, or obstruction
 AB/HR – At bats per home run: at bats divided by home runs
 BA – Batting average (also abbreviated AVG): hits divided by at bats (H/AB)
 BB – Base on balls (also called a "walk"): hitter not swinging at four pitches called out of the strike zone and awarded first base.
 BABIP – Batting average on balls in play: frequency at which a batter reaches a base after putting the ball in the field of play. Also a pitching category.
 BB/K – Walk-to-strikeout ratio: number of bases on balls divided by number of strikeouts
 BsR – Base runs: Another run estimator, like runs created
 EQA – Equivalent average: a player's batting average absent park and league factors
 FC – Fielder's choice: times reaching base safely because a fielder chose to try for an out on another runner
 GO/AO – Ground ball fly ball ratio: number of ground ball outs divided by number of fly ball outs
 GDP or GIDP – Ground into double play: number of ground balls hit that became double plays
 GPA – Gross production average: 1.8 times on-base percentage plus slugging percentage, divided by four
 GS – Grand slam: a home run with the bases loaded, resulting in four runs scoring, and four RBIs credited to the batter
 H – Hit: reaching base because of a batted, fair ball without error by the defense
 HBP – Hit by pitch: times touched by a pitch and awarded first base as a result
 HR – Home runs: hits on which the batter successfully touched all four bases, without the contribution of a fielding error
 HR/H – Home runs per hit: home runs divided by total hits
 ITPHR – Inside-the-park home run: hits on which the batter successfully touched all four bases, without the contribution of a fielding error or the ball going outside the ball park.
 IBB – Intentional base on balls: times awarded first base on balls (see BB above) deliberately thrown by the pitcher.  Also known as IW (intentional walk).
 ISO – Isolated power: a hitter's ability to hit for extra bases, calculated by subtracting batting average from slugging percentage
 K – Strike out (also abbreviated SO): number of times that a third strike is taken or swung at and missed, or bunted foul. Catcher must catch the third strike or batter may attempt to run to first base.
 LOB – Left on base: number of runners neither out nor scored at the end of an inning
 OBP – On-base percentage: times reached base (H + BB + HBP) divided by at bats plus walks plus hit by pitch plus sacrifice flies (AB + BB + HBP + SF)
 OPS – On-base plus slugging: on-base percentage plus slugging average
 PA – Plate appearance: number of completed batting appearances
 PA/SO – Plate appearances per strikeout: number of times a batter strikes out to their plate appearance
 R – Runs scored: number of times a player crosses home plate
 RC – Runs created: an attempt to measure how many runs a player has contributed to their team
 RP – Runs produced: an attempt to measure how many runs a player has contributed
 RBI – Run batted in: number of runners who score due to a batter's action, except when the batter grounded into a double play or reached on an error
 RISP – Runner in scoring position: a breakdown of a batter's batting average with runners in scoring position, which includes runners at second or third base
 SF – Sacrifice fly: fly balls hit to the outfield which, although caught for an out, allow a baserunner to advance
 SH – Sacrifice hit: number of sacrifice bunts which allow runners to advance on the basepaths
 SLG – Slugging percentage: total bases achieved on hits divided by at-bats (TB/AB)
 TA – Total average: total bases, plus walks, plus hit by pitch, plus steals, minus caught stealing divided by at bats, minus hits, plus caught stealing, plus grounded into double plays [(TB + BB + HBP + SB – CS)/(AB – H + CS + GIDP)]
 TB – Total bases: one for each single, two for each double, three for each triple, and four for each home run [H + 2B + (2 × 3B) + (3 × HR)] or [1B + (2 × 2B) + (3 × 3B) + (4 × HR)]
 TOB – Times on base: times reaching base as a result of hits, walks, and hit-by-pitches (H + BB + HBP)
 XBH – Extra base hits: total hits greater than singles (2B + 3B + HR)

Baserunning statistics
 SB – Stolen base: number of bases advanced by the runner while the ball is in the possession of the defense
 CS – Caught stealing: times tagged out while attempting to steal a base
 SBA or ATT – Stolen base attempts: total number of times the player has attempted to steal a base (SB+CS)
 SB% – Stolen base percentage: the percentage of bases stolen successfully. (SB) divided by (SBA) (stolen bases attempted).
 DI – Defensive Indifference: if the catcher does not attempt to throw out a runner (usually because the base would be insignificant), the runner is not awarded a steal. Scored as a fielder's choice.
 R – Runs scored: times reached home plate legally and safely
 UBR – Ultimate base running: a metric that assigns linear weights to every individual baserunning event in order to measure the impact of a player's baserunning skill

Pitching statistics
 BB – Base on balls (also called a "walk"): times pitching four balls, allowing the batter to take first base
 BB/9 – Bases on balls per 9 innings pitched: base on balls multiplied by nine, divided by innings pitched
 BF – Total batters faced: opponent team's total plate appearances
 BK – Balk: number of times pitcher commits an illegal pitching action while in contact with the pitching rubber as judged by umpire, resulting in baserunners advancing one base
 BS – Blown save: number of times entering the game in a save situation, and being charged the run (earned or not) which eliminates his team's lead
 CERA – Component ERA: an estimate of a pitcher's ERA based upon the individual components of his statistical line (K, H, 2B, 3B, HR, BB, HBP)
 CG – Complete game: number of games where player was the only pitcher for their team
 DICE – Defense-Independent Component ERA: an estimate of a pitcher's ERA based upon the defense-independent components of his statistical line (K, HR, BB, HBP) but which also uses number of outs (IP), which is not defense independent.
 ER – Earned run: number of runs that did not occur as a result of errors or passed balls
 ERA – Earned run average: total number of earned runs (see "ER" above), multiplied by 9, divided by innings pitched
 ERA+ – Adjusted ERA+: earned run average adjusted for the ballpark and the league average
 FIP – Fielding independent pitching: a metric, scaled to resemble an ERA, that focuses on events within the pitcher's control – home runs, walks, and strikeouts – but also uses in its denominator the number of outs the team gets (see IP), which is not entirely within the pitcher's control.
 xFIP: This variant substitutes a pitcher's own home run percentage with the league average
 G – Games (AKA "appearances"): number of times a pitcher pitches in a season
 GF – Games finished: number of games pitched where player was the final pitcher for their team as a relief pitcher
 GIDP – Double plays induced: number of double play groundouts induced
 GIDPO – Double play opportunities: number of groundout induced double play opportunities
 GIR – Games in relief: games as a non starting pitcher
 GO/AO or G/F – Ground Out to Air Out ratio, aka Ground ball fly ball ratio: ground balls allowed divided by fly balls allowed
 GS – Starts: number of games pitched where player was the first pitcher for their team
 H (or HA) – Hits allowed: total hits allowed
 H/9 (or HA/9) – Hits allowed per 9 innings pitched: hits allowed times nine divided by innings pitched (also known as H/9IP)
 HB – Hit batsman: times hit a batter with pitch, allowing runner to advance to first base
 HLD (or H) – Hold: number of games entered in a save situation, recorded at least one out, did not surrender the lead, and did not complete the game
 HR (or HRA) – Home runs allowed: total home runs allowed
 HR/9 (or HRA/9) – Home runs per nine innings: home runs allowed times nine divided by innings pitched (also known as HR/9IP)
 IBB – Intentional base on balls allowed
 IP – Innings pitched: the number of outs a team gets while a pitcher is pitching divided by 3
 IP/GS – Average number of innings pitched per game started
 IR – Inherited runners: number of runners on base when the pitcher enters the game
 IRA – Inherited runs allowed: number of inherited runners allowed to score
 K (or SO) – Strikeout: number of batters who received strike three
 K/9 (or SO/9) – Strikeouts per 9 innings pitched: strikeouts times nine divided by innings pitched
 K/BB (or SO/BB) – Strikeout-to-walk ratio: number of strikeouts divided by number of base on balls
 L – Loss: number of games where pitcher was pitching while the opposing team took the lead, never lost the lead, and went on to win
 LOB% – Left-on-base percentage: LOB% represents the percentage of baserunners a pitcher does not allow to score. LOB% tends to regress toward 70–72% over time, so unusually high or low percentages could indicate that pitcher's ERA could be expected to rise or lower in the future. An occasional exception to this logic is a pitcher with a very high strikeout rate.
 OBA (or just AVG) – Opponents batting average: hits allowed divided by at-bats faced
 PC-ST – An individual pitcher's total game pitches [Pitch Count] and [ST] his no. of strikes thrown within that PC.
 PIT (or NP) – Pitches thrown (Pitch count)
 PFR – Power finesse ratio: The sum of strikeouts and walks divided by innings pitched.
 pNERD – Pitcher's NERD: expected aesthetic pleasure of watching an individual pitcher
 QOP – Quality of pitch: comprehensive pitch evaluation statistic which combines speed, location and movement (rise, total break, vertical break and horizontal break) into a single numeric value
 QS – Quality start: a game in which a starting pitcher completes at least six innings and permits no more than three earned runs
 RA – Run average: number of runs allowed times nine divided by innings pitched
 SHO – Shutout: number of complete games pitched with no runs allowed
SIERA – Skill-Interactive Earned Run Average: another advanced stat that measures pitching. SIERA builds on FIP and xFIP by taking a deeper look at what makes pitchers better.
 SV – Save: number of games where the pitcher enters a game led by the pitcher's team, finishes the game without surrendering the lead, is not the winning pitcher, and either (a) the lead was three runs or fewer when the pitcher entered the game; (b) the potential tying run was on base, at bat, or on deck; or (c) the pitcher pitched three or more innings
 SVO – Save opportunity: When a pitcher 1) enters the game with a lead of three or fewer runs and pitches at least one inning, 2) enters the game with the potential tying run on base, at bat, or on deck, or 3) pitches three or more innings with a lead and is credited with a save by the official scorer
 W – Win: number of games where pitcher was pitching while their team took the lead and went on to win, also the starter needs to pitch at least 5 innings of work (also related: winning percentage)
 W + S – Wins in relief + saves.
 whiff rate: a term, usually used in reference to pitchers, that divides the number of pitches swung at and missed by the total number of swings in a given sample. If a pitcher throws 100 pitches at which batters swing, and the batters fail to make contact on 26 of them, the pitcher's whiff rate is 26%.
 WHIP – Walks and hits per inning pitched: average number of walks and hits allowed by the pitcher per inning
 WP – Wild pitches: charged when a pitch is too high, low, or wide of home plate for the catcher to field, thereby allowing one or more runners to advance or score

Fielding statistics
 A – Assists: number of outs recorded on a play where a fielder touched the ball, except if such touching is the putout
 CI – Catcher's Interference (e.g., catcher makes contact with bat)
 DP – Double plays: one for each double play during which the fielder recorded a putout or an assist.
 E – Errors: number of times a fielder fails to make a play he should have made with common effort, and the offense benefits as a result
 FP – Fielding percentage: total plays (chances minus errors) divided by the number of total chances
 INN – Innings: number of innings that a player is at one certain position
 PB – Passed ball: charged to the catcher when the ball is dropped and one or more runners advance
 PO – Putout: number of times the fielder tags, forces, or appeals a runner and he is called out as a result
 RF – Range factor: 9*(putouts + assists)/innings played. Used to determine the amount of field that the player can cover
 TC – Total chances: assists plus putouts plus errors
 TP – Triple play: one for each triple play during which the fielder recorded a putout or an assist
 UZR – Ultimate zone rating:  the ability of a player to defend an assigned "zone" of the field compared to an average defensive player at his position

Overall player value
 VORP – Value over replacement player: a statistic that calculates a player's overall value in comparison to a "replacement-level" player. There are separate formulas for players and pitchers
 Win shares:  a complex metric that gauges a player's overall contribution to his team's wins
 WAR – Wins above replacement: a non-standard formula to calculate the number of wins a player contributes to his team over a "replacement-level player"
 PWA – Player Win Average: performance of players is shown by how much they increase or decrease their team's chances of winning a specific game
 PGP – Player Game Percentage: defined as, "the sum of changes in the probability of winning the game for each play in which the player has participated"

General statistics
 G – Games played: number of games where the player played, in whole or in part
 GS – Games started: number of games a player starts
 GB – Games behind: number of games a team is behind the division leader
 Pythagorean expectation: estimates a team's expected winning percentage based on runs scored and runs allowed

MLB statistical standards

It is difficult to determine quantitatively what is considered to be a "good" value in a certain statistical category, and qualitative assessments may lead to arguments. Using full-season statistics available at the Official Site of Major League Baseball for the 2004 through 2015 seasons, the following tables show top ranges in various statistics, in alphabetical order. For each statistic, two values are given:
Top5: the top five players bettered this value in all of the reported seasons
Best: this is the best of all of the players for all of the reported seasons

See also

Baseball awards
 Cy Young Award winners
 Glossary of baseball
Hank Aaron Award winners (best offensive performer)
List of MLB awards
 MLB Most Valuable Player Award winners
 MLB Rookie of the Year Award winners
 Official Baseball Rules (OBR)
 List of pitches
 Rawlings Gold Glove Award winners
 Retrosheet
 Sabermetrics
Silver Slugger Award winners
Society for American Baseball Research (SABR)
 Strike zone
 Triple Crown in Major League Baseball

References

Bibliography
 Albert, Jim, and Jay M. Bennett. Curve Ball: Baseball, Statistics, and the Role of Chance in the Game. New York: Copernicus Books, 2001. . A book on new statistics for baseball. MLB Record Book by: MLB.com
Alan Schwarz, The Numbers Game: Baseball's Lifelong Fascination with Statistics (New York: St. Martin's, 2005). .
The Official Site of Major League baseball – Baseball Basics: Abbreviations

External links
 Baseball 1 Stats
 Baseball Almanac
 Baseball-Reference.com
 Retrosheet